Brian Tanga (born 13 September 1995) is a Kenyan rugby union player, currently playing for the  in the 2022 Currie Cup First Division. His preferred position is scrum-half or wing.

Professional career
Tanga was named in the  squad for the 2022 Currie Cup First Division.< Tanga is a Kenyan international in both 15-a-side and sevens.

References

External links
itsrugby.co.uk Profile

1995 births
Living people
Rugby union scrum-halves
Rugby union wings
Kenyan rugby union players
Kenya international rugby union players
Simbas players